Ambassadors of Shalom is a British Christian hardcore and Christian rock band, and they primarily play hardcore punk, punk rock, and alternative rock. They come from the United Kingdom. The band started making music in 2012, and their members are lead vocalist and bassist, Pete Field, vocalist and lead guitarist, Neil Roddy, and drummer, Joe Wilson. Their first studio album, Abdicate Self, was released in 2014 by Thumper Punk Records.

Background
Ambassadors of Shalom is a Christian hardcore and Christian rock band from the United Kingdom. Their members are lead vocalist and bassist, Pete Field, vocalist and lead guitarist, Neil Roddy, and drummer, Joe Wilson.

Music history
The band commenced as a musical entity in January 2012 with their release, Abdicate Self, a studio album, that was released by Thumper Punk Records on 11 February 2014.

Members
Current members
 Pete Field - lead vocals, bass
 Neil Roddy - lead guitar, vocals
 Joe Wilson - drums

Discography
Studio albums
 Abdicate Self (February 25, 2014, Thumper Punk)

References

2012 establishments in the United Kingdom
Musical groups established in 2012